The 2002 Toyota Princess Cup was a women's tennis tournament played on outdoor hard courts at the Ariake Colosseum in Tokyo, Japan. It was part of Tier II of the 2002 WTA Tour. It was the sixth and last edition of the tournament and was held from 16 September through 22 September 2002. First-seeded Serena Williams won the singles title and earned $93,000 first-prize money.

Finals

Singles

 Serena Williams defeated  Kim Clijsters, 2–6, 6–3, 6–3
 This was William' 7th singles title of the year and the 18th of her career.

Doubles

 Svetlana Kuznetsova /  Arantxa Sánchez Vicario defeated  Petra Mandula /  Patricia Wartusch, 6–2, 6–4

References

External links
 ITF tournament edition details
 Tournament draws

Toyota Princess Cup
Toyota Princess Cup
Toyota Princess Cup
Toyota Princess Cup
2002 in Japanese women's sport